The Poseidon ("Poseidon", NATO reporting name Kanyon), previously known by Russian codename Status-6, is an autonomous, nuclear-powered unmanned underwater vehicle reportedly in production by Rubin Design Bureau, capable of delivering both conventional and nuclear warheads.

The Poseidon is one of the six new Russian strategic weapons announced by Russian President Vladimir Putin on 1 March 2018.

History
The first public appearance of Poseidon dates back to September 2015 and cites Pentagon sources.

On 10 November 2015, a page of a document that contained information about a secret "oceanic multi-purpose system" called "Status-6" was "accidentally" revealed by Russian NTV television channel. The leak happened during Russian President Vladimir Putin's speech denouncing American plans concerning defensive missile technology. Speculation arose as to whether this was a warning signal or disinformation intended to mislead foreign intelligence services. The CIA has claimed the leak was intentional.

According to the Pentagon, Russia conducted the first test-launch of Poseidon on 27 November 2016, using the B-90 Sarov special purpose submarine. The test was reportedly carried out in the Arctic Ocean.

In early 2018, the Pentagon's Nuclear Posture Review publicly acknowledged development of Russia's "new intercontinental, nuclear armed, nuclear-powered, undersea autonomous torpedo".

In March 2018, the system was officially named "Poseidon", following a public vote.

In January 2019, the Russian Navy announced plans to procure at least 30 Poseidon unmanned underwater vehicles, deployed on four submarines, two of which would serve in the Russian Northern Fleet and two in the Pacific Fleet.

On 2 February 2019, Russian President Vladimir Putin announced completion of the key stage of trials of Poseidon.

On 20 February 2019, the Russian Defence Ministry released a video, showing a Poseidon being test-launched by a B-90 Sarov special purpose submarine.

On 16 January 2023, it was reported that the first batch of the weapons has been manufactured.

Design speculation

Overview

The Poseidon is intended to serve as response to U.S. withdrawal from the ABM treaty and to increase the Russian capability to overcome the U.S. missile defense systems, such as anti-ballistic missiles, railguns, or laser weapons, etc.

The Poseidon warhead can contaminate a large area with radiation. For this purpose, the Poseidon is speculated to be equipped with a cobalt bomb. The Poseidon could be a radiological second strike weapon.

Normal (not salted) thermonuclear weapons cause radioactive fallout primarily through neutron activation of material at the detonation site. Unless the detonation happens at low depths in shallow waters, an underwater detonation will have its fallout greatly reduced, except for at the surface immediately above, near the base surge. Much of the radioactivity will be deposited in the sea, and be carried by ocean currents. Water (and air) will not form radioisotopes suitable for radiological warfare when neutron activated, however the seawater-salt will, and the seabed may.

If used against an aircraft carrier battle group, the battle group would have reduced chances of defending itself against it. The drone could detonate its very large warhead at standoff range, and anti-submarine warfare units would have very little time to react because of the speed at which it travels.

Specifications

Low depth in stealth mode is preferred because sound waves move to ocean floor and reduce radius of detection. Submarines use the same strategy in silent running mode.

Body 

Most likely, the high-strength body of the device is made of titanium alloys.

Powerplant
The National Interest compiled several unclassified defense sources from General Electric experts about the similar 601B project and they predicted low weight and compact gas-cooled nuclear reactor in the drone. Russian submarine designers say that a low-power reactor is preferred for Poseidon because a smaller reactor is less noisy.

Stealth technology

The development includes also use of stealth technology, to elude acoustic tracking devices. Poseidon uses a silent running strategy like other submarines. Its main stealth feature is its very low speed before it reaches the target area. Its high-speed mode activates upon reaching a short finish range (2–3 kilometers), when the probability of detection of the drone is considerably higher. It could travel for weeks toward enemy port cities, reaching high-speed only in the final stage.

A second important stealth feature of the drone is the special design of the pump-jet for clearance of the drone's acoustic signature to imitate the noise of civil ships.

A U.S. intelligence officer told CNBC that the Poseidon is difficult to detect and difficult to target in stealth mode.

Supercavitation
Poseidon is a family of drones, some of which are designed only for destroying coastal cities and thus rely on "stealth" capabilities rather than on high speed, others of which are primarily designed to attack carrier battle groups and were claimed to possibly harness supercavitation, like the VA-111 Shkval torpedo, to attain extremely high speeds (>230 mph) in attack mode. However, supercavitation devices have not been observed on the available footage of Poseidon. The Pentagon estimates maximum speed of the Poseidon to be about  without the supercavitation option.

Launch platforms
The two ships speculated to carry the Poseidon are the Project 09852 modified Oscar-class submarine Belgorod and the Project 09851 Khabarovsk submarines. Oscar-class submarines could carry six Poseidon torpedoes at the same time for a total yield of up to 12 megatons.

According to some reports, Poseidon may have a seabed or mobile site launch option. In this configuration, known as Skif (Скиф) and patented by designer Alexander Shalnev, Poseidon can be staged on the sea floor in a special container as long as necessary. Russian auxiliary vessels Zvezdochka (Project 20180) and Akademik Aleksandrov (Project 20183), both of which feature ice-breaking capabilities, are involved in testing of Poseidon drones, indicating that these ships may be used as platforms for deploying and retrieving such a seabed version.

Propaganda
In 2022, Russian domestic TV propaganda said Poseidon will be able to "plunge Britain into the depths of the sea". According to Russian propaganda during the invasion of Ukraine, the Poseidon Torpedo may initiate a 500m high shockwave.

Various sources disregard these claims by showing the wave-generating principle differences against a natural-occurring tsunami, where the big ones are usually more directed (as opposed to 360° spread caused by an undersea explosion, and thus much bigger attenuation by distance). Additionally, the energy released e.g. by the 2011 Japan Tsunami was still 163000 times bigger than Tsar Bomba (upper estimated possible power of the system in question). A thing to consider is the nuclear fallout. It is unclear what strategic advantages this provides over direct use of Nuclear weapons.

Reactions
Following the Russian President Vladimir Putin's statements during his presentation of several new Russian super-weapons in March 2018, in which he specifically referenced to the Poseidon as a weapon which  could also target and hit American port cities, U.S. Defense Secretary James Mattis stated Russia already had the potential capability of targeting certain port cities on the American coastline with missiles, and said thus Poseidon "does not change at all the strategic balance".

Future users

 Russian Navy – more than 30 planned

See also

 Anti-Ballistic Missile Treaty
 Avangard (hypersonic glide vehicle)
 9M730 Burevestnik – a Russian nuclear-powered cruise missile
 Mutual assured destruction
 Nuclear torpedo
 K-329 Belgorod
 RS-28 Sarmat

References

External links

Post–Cold War weapons of Russia
Nuclear weapons of Russia
Naval weapons of Russia
Submarines of Russia
Unmanned underwater vehicles